The Hydra Cluster (or Abell 1060) is a galaxy cluster that contains 157 bright galaxies, appearing in the constellation Hydra. The cluster spans about ten million light-years and has an unusually high proportion of dark matter. The cluster is part of the Hydra–Centaurus Supercluster located 158 million light-years from Earth. The cluster's largest galaxies are elliptical galaxies NGC 3309 and NGC 3311 and the spiral galaxy NGC 3312 all having a diameter of about 150,000 light-years.
In spite of a nearly circular appearance on the sky, there is evidence in the galaxy velocities for a clumpy, three-dimensional distribution.

References

Related reading
 Wehner, Elizabeth M. H. and Harris, William E. (10 August 2006) UCD candidates in the Hydra Cluster . ArXiv.org. ApL Letters
 

 
Galaxy clusters
1060
Abell richness class 1
Hydra-Centaurus Supercluster